Del Pezzo  may refer to:
Del Pezzo surface
Pasquale del Pezzo
Del Pezzo Restaurant